SS Admiral Nakhimov, launched in March 1925 and originally named SS Berlin, was a passenger liner of the German Weimar Republic later converted to a hospital ship, then a Soviet passenger ship. On 31 August 1986, Admiral Nakhimov collided with the large bulk carrier Pyotr Vasev  in the Tsemes Bay, near the port of Novorossiysk, Russian SFSR, and quickly sank. In total, 423 of the 1,234 people on board died.

History

Berlin

Pre-War Service 

Berlin was built by Bremer Vulkan at Vegesack, Germany (Yard 614) and was completed in March 1925. She was launched on 25 March 1925, and commissioned on 17 September 1925. She originally operated the Bremen – Southampton – Cherbourg – New York City run for the North German Lloyd Line.

The ship's main route was between Bremerhaven, Southampton and New York, which she began on 26 September 1925 and operated until May 1939 when she was laid up in Bremerhaven for refitting. On 12 November 1928, Berlin rescued the passengers and crew of the liner , which sank off the coast of Virginia en route from New York City to Barbados. An estimated 113 people died in the sinking.

Berlin was chartered by the Nazis in 1939 as a Strength Through Joy (Kraft durch Freude, KdF) workers' vacation ship and was later used as a hospital ship during World War II.

World War II 

Berlin was one of eight German ships commissioned as hospital ships (Lazarettschiffe) during World War II. Most, if not all, of these ships also served in other capacities during the war after being decommissioned as hospital ships, mainly as accommodation or transport ships for military personnel. All German hospital ships were given alphabetic identifiers, Berlins being 'A'. On 16 July 1939, Berlin began her conversion to hospital ship and entered service with the Kriegsmarine as Lazarettschiff A, Sanitätsamt Ost on 23 August 1939. The ship had berthing for 400 patients, with a crew of 165. Initially serving in Norwegian waters, she was identified as "Field Post Number 07520". By January 1945, Berlin  was assigned to Operation Hannibal, the transport of refugees and soldiers from the Eastern Baltic. On 31 January 1945, while forming up in convoy to head east, Berlin struck a mine off Swinemünde, and was put in tow for Kiel.
She then hit another mine and was beached (23.53 hr, at position 54°02.6 N/14°19 E, in shallow waters). There was one fatality. All usable equipment was salvaged by 5 February 1945, and the ship was abandoned.

Admiral Nakhimov

According to the reparations, Berlin went to the Soviet Union. In 1946, work began on its lifting by the Emergency Rescue Service of the Baltic Fleet. In a short time, all compartments were sealed under water and pumping of water was started. However, the liner was mined by the Germans, and when during the ascent on New Year's Eve 1947, its bow appeared above the surface of the water, a strong explosion occurred.

The ship sank for the second time, press down the diver Timofey Starchenko, who went down under its bottom to plug a leak in one of the aft compartments. The diver was pressed into the mud, but he was saved by a hard copper helmet. Thanks to the quickly performed unique rescue operation, the diver managed to pull out alive through a tunnel specially made under the bottom of the steamer. On the second attempt, the ship was lifted and sent for major repairs. The ship was renamed Admiral Nakhimov in honor of Admiral Pavel Nakhimov, a 19th-century Russian naval commander who played a prominent role in the Crimean War. She entered passenger service for the Black Sea Steamship Company in 1957. In 1962, during the Cuban Missile Crisis, the ship was used to transport soldiers to Cuba.

During the peak summer travel season, Admiral Nakhimov operated cruises on the Black Sea between Odessa and Batumi, a six-day round trip. She carried an average of 1,000 people per voyage. She was the flagship of the Black Sea passenger fleet for several years until more modern liners entered service.

Sinking 

At 10:00 p.m. Moscow Time on 31 August 1986, Admiral Nakhimov sailed from Novorossiysk en route to Sochi, its next stop. There were 888 passengers and 346 crew members aboard. Most of the passengers were Ukrainian, with the remainder from Russia, Moldova, and other parts of the then Soviet Union. The captain of the ship was Vadim Markov.

Just minutes into the voyage, the ship's pilot noticed that the large bulk carrier Pyotr Vasev was on a collision course with Admiral Nakhimov. Pyotr Vasev was a Japanese-built, 18,604-ton freighter recently acquired by the Soviet Union, and was carrying a cargo of oats and barley from Canada. The pilot radioed a warning to Pyotr Vasev, and the freighter responded, "Don't worry. We will pass clear of each other. We will take care of everything."

Despite the message, Captain Viktor Tkachenko of Pyotr Vasev did nothing to slow his ship or change course. Convinced that the freighter would pass without incident, Captain Markov of Admiral Nakhimov retired to his cabin, leaving his second mate Alexander Chudnovsky in charge. From 11:00 p.m., Chudnovsky radioed Pyotr Vasev several times, asking about her course and her further actions. Chudnovsky changed the ship's course 10 degrees portside. At 11:10 p.m., Chundovsky cried on VHF to the freighter, "Immediately reverse full astern!"  When it was clear that the freighter was headed directly for the ship, Pyotr Vasyovs engines were thrown in reverse. Admiral Nakhimov turned hard to port, but it was too late.

Admiral Nakhimov continued forward with the freighter's bow in its side, ripping a  hole in the hull between the engine and boiler rooms.

Admiral Nakhimov immediately took on a list on her starboard side, and her lights went out upon impact. After a few seconds, the emergency diesel generator powered on, but the lights went out again two minutes later, plunging the sinking ship into darkness. People below decks found themselves lost in the dark and rapidly canting hallways. Without power, the system of remote closing the watertight bulkheads' doors did not work (although, due to the flooding of two compartments, a ship with the current design would still not be able to stay afloat).

There was no time to launch the lifeboats. This was exacerbated by the fact that a rapidly formed strong list prevented this, quickly exceeding the design allowable 20 degrees; in addition, according to the some of the witness, the lifeboats and davits were painted on the spot (and old davits were destroyed by corrosion), which made launching at least some of them impossible (Similar cases were noted earlier in some other shipwrecks, such as the PS General Slocum or TSMS Lakonia cases.) From the forecastle on the port side, it was possible to lower one lifeboat, but by that time there was no longer the power needed for the winches to lower it into the water. Only later, when the ship was sinking, the lifeboat was able to sail. As a result, life rafts had to be thrown from the ship into the water, out of 48 they managed to drop 32. Hundreds of people dived into the oily water, clinging to lifejackets, barrels and pieces of debris.

Admiral Nakhimov sank in only seven minutes. Rescue ships began arriving just 10 minutes after the ship went down. Pyotr Vasev was not badly damaged, and assisted in the rescue effort. Sixty-four rescue ships and 20 helicopters rushed to the scene, and 836 people were pulled from the water. Some people were so slick with fuel oil that they could not keep hold of the hands of their rescuers. Sailors had to jump into the water to save people.

Admiral Nakhimov lacked proper ventilation, which was the reason all 90 windows in the cabins were open during the accident. The several bulkheads that would have prevented the ship from sinking were removed during the conversion. The Admiral Nakhimov after that was able to float with only one compartment flooded, while most other ships could float with at least two filled with water.

Pyotr Vasev was renamed and operated under other flags until 2012.

Victims 
Passengers and crew had little time to escape, and 423 of the 1,234 on board perished. Sixty-four of those killed were crew members and 359 were passengers. The event was not reported in the news for forty eight hours. The survivors were only allowed to send telegrams saying "Alive and well in Novorossiysk."

Search for drowned

To help the divers of the Black Sea Shipping Company, a large specialized rescue vessel SS-21 arrived at the scene of the Admiral Nakhimov tragedy after 10 hours, which, after a months-long campaign, had just returned to Sevastopol from the Mediterranean Sea.  The reconnaissance divers of the 17th Special Forces Brigade of the Black Sea Fleet were also urgently involved in the rescue work. Military divers immediately joined the work on the inspection of the sunken liner. It was extremely difficult to search underwater on an overturned vessel.

For greater safety, the divers inside the ship worked in pairs, and on the upper decks used balloon breathing apparatus with an autonomous supply of oxygen-nitrogen mixture. The oak doors of the Nakhimov's interiors were heavily swollen from water, as a result of which they often had to be undermined with explosive charges. Working at night on board the sunken liner, having spent a lot of time and effort installing explosives, and then also on the way back through the maze of corridors, divers Lieutenant Commander Igor Ivlev and Midshipman Yuri Polishchuk used up almost the entire supply of breathing mixture. Helping a friend, Polishchuk himself lost consciousness from lack of air, as a result of which, when climbing to the surface, he fell out of the diving gazebo again to the bottom. At great risk, working almost without decompression, other divers managed to find Polishchuk, quickly lift him onto the ship and place him in a pressure chamber. Doctors fought for the life of the brave sailor for a long time, but they could not save him. On September 10, 1986, midshipman Yuri Vladimirovich Polishchuk, commander of a platoon of reconnaissance divers of the Black Sea Fleet Special Forces brigade, died without regaining consciousness.

After this incident, it became more common (especially when working on the lower decks) to use diving equipment with the traditional supply of a breathing mixture through a hose from the ship providing descent. On September 19, 1986, midshipman Sergei Alexandrovich Shardakov was given the task to get into the 41st cabin, in which, according to eyewitnesses, children remained locked. Trying to open the door with a crowbar, he got tangled in his own cables and hoses, could not ventilate the suit in time and lost consciousness… The partner managed to pull the unconscious midshipman out of the corridor, but he died before the arrival of help from the surface. After the death of the second diver, as well as due to the completion of the survey of most of the premises, the production of underwater work on the sunken liner was stopped by the decision of the Government Commission.  Divers have not been able to get into some cabins.

Investigation 
The Soviet government formed a commission of inquiry to investigate the disaster. It determined that both Captain Markov of Admiral Nakhimov and Captain Tkachenko of Pyotr Vasev had violated navigational safety rules. Despite repeated orders to let Admiral Nakhimov pass, Tkachenko refused to slow his ship and only reported the accident 40 minutes after it occurred. Captain Markov was absent from the bridge. The inquiry took place in 1987 in Odessa. In March 1987, the captains of both vessels: Vadim Georgievich Markov, captain of the Admiral Nakhimov, and Viktor Ivanovich Tkachenko, captain of the Pyotr Vasev, were found equally guilty of shipwreck, loss of life and sentenced to 15 years in prison each. Both captains were released early in the fall of 1992. After his release, V.G. Markov worked as a captain-mentor in the Black Sea Shipping Company and lived in the city of Odessa (where he died in 2007). V.I. Tkachenko immediately after his release went abroad, and under circumstances that were not fully clarified, he died in September 2003 when a yacht crashed near the coast of Canada.

See also
 List of peacetime ship disasters by death toll
 List of ships with the name Admiral Nakhimov

References

Bibliography

External links
  A website dedicated to the catastrophe
 (in Russian) Столкновение в Цемесской бухте — Википедия (wikipedia.org)

 https://www.nytimes.com/1986/09/07/weekinreview/the-world-two-soviet-ships-collide-in-the-night.html

Ocean liners
Steamships of Germany
Steamships of the Soviet Union
Ships of Black Sea Shipping Company
Shipwrecks in the Black Sea
Ships of Norddeutscher Lloyd
World War II passenger ships of Germany
Maritime incidents in 1986
1986 in the Soviet Union
1925 ships
Ships sunk in collisions
Hospital ships in World War II
Maritime incidents in the Soviet Union
Maritime incidents in Russia
Maritime incidents in January 1945
Passenger ships of the Soviet Union